Mega Man 2: The Power Fighters is an arcade video game, released in Japan in 1996 as a fighting game in the Mega Man series of games. It is the direct sequel to Mega Man: The Power Battle released the previous year. Both games were ported to home consoles in North America in 2004 as part of the Mega Man Anniversary Collection for PlayStation 2, Xbox, and GameCube and in Japan during the same year as part of two game compilation titled , also for the PlayStation 2. An adaptation of both games for the Neo Geo Pocket Color, titled , was also made. Both games were later re-released as part of the Capcom Arcade 2nd Stadium compilation in 2022.

Plot
Like The Power Battle, each character has an epilogue once the player beats the game. However, in The Power Fighters, the epilogues are more detailed and have more to do with past and future Mega Man games, providing vague explanations regarding characters and canon, most notably the Evil Energy incident from Mega Man 8 and how Dr. Wily created Zero from the Mega Man X series.

Gameplay
The gameplay is roughly the same as in Mega Man: The Power Battle, as it keeps the controls, stages, and weapon-copying. There are, however, several new additions. The playable characters are Mega Man, Proto Man, Bass, and Duo, with Duo being a new addition to the cast. The four characters feature different attributes and abilities.

As in The Power Battle, there are three "stories" to choose from after: finding Dr. Wily, saving Roll, and recovering the stolen parts. All of the stories have different Robot Masters to fight, and halfway through the player is given a different power-up. Unlike the previous game, The Power Fighters lets the player choose freely between Robot Master stages, and is given some hints on what the Robot Masters weaknesses are. Each of the characters can perform a special attack, which is executed by releasing a full buster charge while holding the joystick up. Mega Man's special move, the "Mega Upper," is a jumping uppercut (like the Shoryuken); Proto Man's special move, the "Proto Strike," allows him to shoot a short-ranged, massive burst of energy; Bass' special move, the "Crescent Kick," (similar to the Flash Kick, another special move from the Street Fighter series), lets him perform a somersaulting kick; Duo's special move, the "Giant Knuckle," is a standing uppercut that flings the enemy upwards (if the attack button is pressed again after the uppercut, Duo will jump up and slam the enemy down to the ground).

As the player damages the Robot Masters, various energy pellets come out of them. Some of these are for points, while others will restore health, weapon energy, or both. When the Robot Master is defeated, a multitude of these pellets are released, as well as a capsule (similar to those seen in Mega Man 8) containing the boss's special weapon. During a two-player game, only the player who picks up the capsule will get the special weapon. One of the items that can appear during battle will summon a robot helper. Mega Man summons Rush, who will do a dash attack towards the enemy when Mega Man fires a charged shot, and can be bounced from using the Rush Coil. Bass summons Treble, who will fire plasma shots each time Bass fires his buster, and perform a dash attack similar to Rush's when Bass fires a charged shot. Proto Man and Duo both summon Beat, who will give them an energy shield that makes them completely invincible for a short time. These summoning abilities will last until their energy runs out, and they cannot be cancelled. While a helper or their effect is active, special weapons cannot be used. Lastly, each Robot Master now has an Overdrive mode; after a Robot Master loses half or more of their health, the screen will go dark, they will flash, and their attack patterns will change. Some Robot Masters will gain new moves, some will gain new weapons, and others will become more difficult to hit.

Audio

Rockman 2: The Power Fighters was created by the Capcom Sound Team. It was released by Victor Entertainment on September 21, 1996 in Japan only. The soundtrack contains pieces arrange from previous Mega Man games written by Yuki Iwai, Yuko Kadota, Syun Nishigaki, Setsuo Yamamoto, Hideki Okugawa, Masato Koda, and Tatsuro Suzuki.

References

External links

Rockman: Power Battle Fighters official website 

1996 video games
Arcade video games
CP System II games
Fighting games
Multiplayer and single-player video games
Video games developed in Japan
Video games scored by Masato Kouda
Power Fighters